The 2006 Dublin Women's Soccer League was the 13th season of the women's association football league featuring teams from the Greater Dublin Area. The season began on 14 May and concluded on 30 August. UCD won the title for the fourth successive season.

Final table

Matches

Notes

References

2006
2005–06 domestic women's association football leagues
2006–07 domestic women's association football leagues
2006 in Republic of Ireland association football leagues
1